The Municipal Corporation of Faridabad (MCF) is the Municipal Corporation responsible for the city of Faridabad in Haryana state. Municipal Corporation mechanism in India was introduced during British Rule with formation of municipal corporation in Madras (Chennai) in 1688, later followed by municipal corporations in Bombay (Mumbai) and Calcutta (Kolkata) by 1762.Faridabad Municipal Corporation has been formed with functions to improve the infrastructure of town.
It divides the city of Faridabad into 40 wards and was created in the year 1993. For the period of 2017-21 the Mayor of MCF is Suman Bala.

History and administration 

Faridabad Municipal Corporation was formed  to improve the infrastructure of the town as per the needs of local population.
Faridabad Municipal Corporation has been categorised into wards and each ward is headed by councillor for which elections are held every 5 years.

Faridabad Municipal Corporation is governed by mayor and administered by Municipal Commissioner Yashpal Yadav.

Revenue sources 

The following are the Income sources for the Corporation from the Central and State Government.

Revenue from taxes 
Following is the Tax related revenue for the corporation.

 Property tax.
 Profession tax.
 Entertainment tax.
 Grants from Central and State Government like Goods and Services Tax.
 Advertisement tax.

Revenue from non-tax sources 

Following is the Non Tax related revenue for the corporation.

 Water usage charges.
 Fees from Documentation services.
 Rent received from municipal property.
 Funds from municipal bonds.

See also
Faridabad

Notes

External links
 Official Website

Faridabad
Municipal corporations in Haryana
1993 establishments in Haryana